Raul António dos Santos Barbosa (born 18 May 1972) is an Angolan footballer. He played in three matches for the Angola national football team in 1998. He was also named in Angola's squad for the 1998 African Cup of Nations tournament.

References

External links
 
 

1972 births
Living people
Angolan footballers
Angola international footballers
1998 African Cup of Nations players
Place of birth missing (living people)
Association football defenders
S.C. Farense players
Boavista F.C. players
F.C. Felgueiras players
C.F. União players
C.D. Santa Clara players
Angolan expatriate footballers
Expatriate footballers in Portugal